Leon Hess (March 14, 1914 – May 7, 1999) was an American businessman, the founder of the Hess Corporation and the owner of the New York Jets. Hess built an oil terminal in New Jersey after the Great Depression, building his first refinery in the late 1950s. He sold his company, Hess Oil and Chemical, in 1963 and joined a consortium to buy the New York Jets. Hess was responsible for moving the Jets to Giants Stadium in East Rutherford, New Jersey in 1984. 

In 1969, Hess acquired Amerada Petroleum Corporation, one of the largest producers of crude oil in the United States. The acquisition saw Amerada merging with Hess Oil and Chemical to form the Amerada Hess Corporation. Hess served as chairman and CEO until 1995. He died at the age of 85 on May 7, 1999. Hess was posthumously inducted into the New Jersey Hall of Fame in 2011.

Early life
Hess was born on March 14, 1914, to a Jewish family in Asbury Park, New Jersey. His parents were Ethel and Mores Hess, who was a kosher butcher who had emigrated from Lithuania and—after arriving in the United States—worked as an oil delivery man in Asbury Park, New Jersey.  Hess worked as a driver for his father's company and, after it went bankrupt in 1933 during the Great Depression, he reorganized the company.  He built an oil terminal in Perth Amboy, New Jersey out of old oil tankers and aggressively underbid his competitors to win Federal oil contracts.  He served in World War II, rising to the rank of major, and serving as the fuel supply officer for General George S. Patton, where he further developed his logistical expertise.

Career
After the war, using a network of smaller terminals, Hess's success continued.  In the late 1950s, he built his first refinery; and in 1960, he opened a chain of gas stations.  In the early 1960s, he built the world's largest oil refinery at the time on St. Croix in the United States Virgin Islands to take advantage of federal tax benefits.  The refinery was able to secure foreign refiner status (allowing it to circumvent the federal rule that required the use of higher-cost U.S.-flagged vessels when shipping oil to the East Coast) while also receiving subsidies from the United States Department of Energy as a domestic refinery.  In 1963, his company, Hess Oil and Chemical, went public.  In 1969, using the proceeds from the Hess sale, he acquired the Amerada Petroleum Corporation, one of the largest producers of crude oil in the United States.  As part of the purchase, he merged it with his former company, Hess Oil and Chemical, to form the Amerada Hess Corporation.  Hess served as chairman and CEO of Amerada Hess until 1995.

New York Jets
In 1963, Hess was part of a consortium that bought the New York Jets which included Sonny Werblin, Philip H. Iselin, Townsend B. Martin, and Donald Lillis. His initial investment was $250,000.  He bought out his partners: Werblin in 1968, the heirs of Iselin in 1977, Martin in 1981 and in 1984 became the sole owner of the club after purchasing the last quarter-share from Helen Dillon, Lillis' daughter.  The Jets played in Shea Stadium in 1964 after four seasons in the Polo Grounds.  In 1984 Hess moved the team to Giants Stadium in East Rutherford, New Jersey.

Personal life and death
In 1947, he married Norma Wilentz.  Wilentz's father was former  Attorney General of New Jersey David T. Wilentz who prosecuted Bruno Richard Hauptmann in the Lindbergh baby kidnapping case.  They had three children: Marlene Hess Zirin, Constance H. Williams, and John B. Hess.  Marlene is married to lawyer, writer, and cable TV talk show host, James D. Zirin.

Hess died at Lenox Hill Hospital on May 7, 1999, from a "blood disease".

Legacy
In 2011, Hess was inducted into the New Jersey Hall of Fame.  In 2014, the New York Jets selected Hess, along with former wide receiver Wayne Chrebet, to be the year's inductees into its Ring of Honor.

The  Leon Hess Business School at Monmouth University and the Leon and Norma Hess Center for Science and Medicine of the Mount Sinai Health System in New York City  were named for him.

References

1914 births
1999 deaths
American businesspeople in the oil industry
New York Jets owners
Hess family
People from Asbury Park, New Jersey
Jewish American sportspeople
American people of Lithuanian-Jewish descent
Jewish American military personnel
United States Army personnel of World War II
20th-century American businesspeople
United States Army officers